Inverse condemnation is a term used in the law to describe a situation in which the government takes private property but fails to pay the compensation required by the 5th Amendment of the Constitution, so the property's owner has to sue to obtain the required just compensation. In some states the term also includes damaging of property as well as its taking. In inverse condemnation cases the owner is the plaintiff and that is why the action is called inverse the order of parties is reversed, as compared to the usual procedure in direct condemnation where the government is the plaintiff who sues a defendant-owner to take his or her property.

Taking of property

Definition of taking
The taking can be physical (e.g., land seizure, flooding, retention of possession after a lease to the government expires, deprivation of access, removal of ground support) or it can be a regulatory taking (when regulations are so onerous that they make the regulated property unusable by its owner for any reasonable or economically viable purpose).  The latter is the most controversial form of inverse condemnation.  It can occur when the regulation of the property's use is so severe that it goes "too far," as Justice Holmes put it in Pennsylvania Coal Co. v. Mahon, 260 U.S. 393 (1922), and deprives the owner of the property's value, utility or marketability, denying him or her the benefits of property ownership thus accomplishing a constitutionally forbidden de facto taking without compensation.

Types of regulatory takings
The Supreme Court of the United States has not elaborated on what "too far" is, and the doctrinal basis for its jurisprudence has been widely criticized as confused and inconsistent. But the court has articulated three situations in which inverse condemnation occurs. These are (a) physical seizure or occupation, (b) the reduction of the regulated property's utility or value to such an extent that it is no longer capable of economically viable use, and (c) where as a precondition to the issuance of a building permit, the government demands that the regulated owner convey property to the government even though there is no rational nexus between the owner's activity's impact on public resources and the owner's proposed regulated use, or where the extent of the exaction is not proportional to the effect of the owner's activities (Nollan v. California Coastal Commission and Dolan v. City of Tigard).

Factors
Apart from these three situations known as per se regulatory takings, the decision whether or not a taking has occurred is made by judicial consideration of three factors: (a) the nature of the government regulation, (b) the economic impact of the regulation on the subject property, and (c) the extent to which the regulation interferes with the owner's reasonable, investment-backed expectations. This is known as the three-factor Penn Central test (after Penn Central Transportation Co. v. New York City where it was articulated). The Penn Central decision has been severely criticized by commentators on both sides of the "taking issue" controversy, because its "three-factor" approach is so vague that it enables judges to reach whatever result they prefer. It also makes it extremely difficult for lawyers to tell in advance of filing a lawsuit what facts will be deemed decisive by the court, and how to apply them. The problem is that the U.S. Supreme court has failed to articulate the elements of a cause of action in regulatory taking cases, offering its supposed inability to do so as the reason, and has offered only those "factors," without indicating what importance to ascribe to each, and how to determine whether they have been established.

Particular examples
Railroads and other public utilities which are granted the power of condemnation (or eminent domain) by state statute, can be liable for inverse taking or where appropriate, when they take or damage private property when they act in the performance of their regulated activities.

An inverse taking need not be a taking of land or rights in land (such as easements). It can be a taking of personal property (e.g. supplies for the army in wartime), intellectual property (patents and copyrights), as well as contracts.

Legal process
The trial of a typical inverse condemnation action is bifurcated. First, there is a bench trial to determine liability, and if the judge determines that a taking has occurred, there is a second (typically jury) trial to determine compensation. Some states (i.e., New York, Connecticut and Rhode Island) do not provide jury trials in such cases. The measure of compensation is the same as in direct condemnation actions in which the government concedes that a taking has occurred, and the sole issue is the amount of compensation.

By statute, many states also provide for recovery of attorneys' and appraisers' fees in successful inverse condemnation actions.

See also
Williamson County Regional Planning Commission v. Hamilton Bank of Johnson City
see also
Knick v. Township of Scott, Pennsylvania, et al US Supreme Court No.17-647. Decided June 21, 2019

References
Gideon Kanner, Making Laws and Sausages: A Quarter Century Retrospective on Penn Central Transportation Co. v. City of New York, 13 William & Mary Bill of Rights Journal 679 (2005).